Yann Hubert (born January 9, 1985 in Bagnols-sur-Cèze) is a French professional football player. Currently, he plays in the Ligue 2 for AC Arles-Avignon.

1985 births
Living people
French footballers
Ligue 2 players
AC Arlésien players
Association football goalkeepers